Ratkovići is a village in the municipalities of Lopare (Republika Srpska) and Čelić, Tuzla Canton, Bosnia and Herzegovina.

Demographics 
According to the 2013 census, its population was 1,106, with only 5 of them living in the Lopare part, and 1,101 in Čelić.

References

Populated places in Lopare
Populated places in Čelić